River Parishes Community College is a public community college in Gonzales, Louisiana. 

It was previously located in Sorrento, Louisiana but was moved to Gonzales in 2014 with the construction of a new campus in the Edenborne Development. In August 2016, students from Galvez Primary, Lake Elementary, and St. Amant Primary School were sent to the old campus because the schools in Ascension Parish were flooded. RPCC also offers an Early College program for high-school freshmen to obtain their Associate's Degree and High School Diploma at the same time.

The college was established in the late 1990s, pursuant to state legislation organizing the system of community and technical colleges.

References

External links
 Official website

Community colleges in Louisiana
Universities and colleges accredited by the Southern Association of Colleges and Schools
Education in Ascension Parish, Louisiana
Buildings and structures in Ascension Parish, Louisiana